Pan-Asianism (also known as Asianism or Greater Asianism) is an ideology aimed at creating a political and economic unity among Asian peoples. Various theories and movements of Pan-Asianism have been proposed, particularly from East, South and Southeast Asia. The motive for the movement was in opposition to the values of Western imperialism and colonialism, and that Asian values preceded European values.

Japanese Asianism

Pre-World War II Japanese Pan-Asianism was, at its core, the idea that Asia should unite against European imperialism.  Japan was the first Asian nation to abolish the unequal treaties it had earlier made with America and Europe.

Japanese Asianism developed in intertwining among debates on solidarity with Asian nations who were under pressure of Europe and on aggressive expansion to the Asian continent. The former debates originated from liberalism. Their ideologues were Tokichi Tarui (1850–1922) who argued for equal Japan-Korea unionization for cooperative defence against the European powers, and Kentaro Oi (1843–1922) who attempted domestic constitutional government in Japan and reforms of Korea. Pan-Asian thought in Japan began to develop in the late 19th century and was spurred on particularly following the defeat of Russia in the Russo-Japanese War (1904–1905). This created interest from Indian poets Rabindranath Tagore and Sri Aurobindo and Chinese politician Sun Yat-sen.

The growing official interest in broader Asian concerns was shown in the establishment of facilities for Indian Studies. In 1899, Tokyo Imperial University set up a chair in Sanskrit and Kawi, with a further chair in comparative religion being set up in 1903. In this environment, a number of Indian students came to Japan in the early twentieth century, founding the Oriental Youngmen's Association in 1900. Their anti-British political activity caused consternation to the Indian Government, following a report in the London Spectator.

However, Japanese society had been strongly inclined to ultranationalism from the Freedom and People's Rights Movement. The latter debates on aggressive expansionism to Asia became clearly apparent. Their representatives were the Black Ocean Society and the Black Dragon Society. The Black Dragon Society (1933) argued for Japanese imperialism and expansionism, and they led to a debate on securing the Asian continent under Japanese control. Exceptionally, Ryōhei Uchida (1874–1937), who was a member of the Black Dragon Society, was a Japan-Korea unionist and activist of Philippines and Chinese revolutions.

Tōten Miyazaki (1870–1922) consistently supported a Chinese revolution of Sun Yat-sen with spiritual sacrifice and sympathy under imperial Japan. According to Yamada Junzaburō, a contemporary of Toten who served Sun Yat-sen until his death, a favorite saying of Sun was: "The revival of Asia will not occur without collaboration of China and Japan; and without the revival of Asia, there will be no peace of the world." The reason Japanese such as  Toten and Yamada brothers, gave themselves to Chinese Revolution was their belief in Pan-Asianism. Okakura Kakuzō (1862–1913) criticized European imperialism as a destroyer of human beauty, and argued for romantic solidarity with diverse "Asia as one" against European civilization.

<blockquote>
ASIA is one. The Himalayas divide, only to accentuate, two mighty civilisations, the Chinese with its communism of Confucius, and the Indian with its individualism of the Vedas. But not even the snowy barriers can interrupt for one moment that broad expanse of love for the Ultimate and Universal, which is the common thought-inheritance of every Asiatic race, enabling them to produce all the great religions of the world, and distinguishing them from those maritime peoples of the Mediterranean and the Baltic, who love to dwell on the Particular, and to search out the means, not the end, of life.</blockquote>

In this Okakura was utilising the Japanese concept of sangoku, which existed in Japanese culture before the concept of Asia became popularised. Sangoku literally means the "three countries": Honshu (the largest island of Japan), Kara (China) and Tenjiku (India).

However, most Pan-Asianists were nationalistic and imperialistic and were connected with rightist organizations. They discussed self-righteous solidarity which led to ideology such as a "new order" of East Asia and "Greater East Asia Co-prosperity Sphere" based on Japanese supremacy.

New Greater Asianism from China
From a Chinese perspective, Japanese Asianism was interpreted as a rationalized ideology for Japanese military aggression and political absorption (cf. Twenty-One Demands). In 1917, Li Dazhao (1889–1927) argued for the liberation of Asian nations and equal greater Asian union. In 1924, Sun Yat-sen (1866–1925) stated that the West was hegemonic and the East was Confucian, and he argued for full independence by resisting colonialism with "Greater Asianism" which unified Asian nations.

 Early period of Pan-Asianism 
More significant and successful spread of Pan-Asianism than Japan's period in World War II was seen during the reign of Genghis Khan (Temuchin).. At the beginning of the 13th century, Genghis Khan wanted to unite all the tribes in Central Asia (especially the nomadic tribes) and unite them into a single nation and gather the Mongolian political identity under the same roof. He went on to establish the Mongol Empire, which at its height became the world's largest contiguous land empire.

 Turkish Pan-Asianism 
Pan-Asianism in Turkey has not yet been fully explored, it is not known how many people hold this ideology and how widespread it is. However, Turks who supports Japan in the Second World War and has the Pan-Asianism ideology uses a redesigned Turkish flag based on Japan's flag in the Second World War.

Pan-Asianism post World War II

Political leaders from Sun Yat-sen in the 1910s and 20s to Mahathir Mohamad in the 1990s argue that the political models and ideologies of Europe lack values and concepts found in Asian societies and philosophies. European values such as individual rights and freedoms would not be suited for Asian societies in this extreme formulation of Pan-Asianism.

The idea of "Asian values" is somewhat of a resurgence of Pan-Asianism. One foremost enthusiast of the idea was the former Prime Minister of Singapore, Lee Kuan Yew. In India, Ram Manohar Lohia dreamed of a united socialist Asia.

See also
Greater East Asia Conference
Greater East Asia Co-Prosperity Sphere 
Asiacentrism
ASEAN (1967 to the present)
Asia Council
Asian Development Bank
Asian Infrastructure Investment Bank
Asian Relations Conference
Bandung Conference (1955)
Belt and Road Initiative
East Asian Community
South Asian Association for Regional Cooperation
Asia Cooperation Dialogue
Regional Comprehensive Economic Partnership
Pan-nationalism
Fusao Hayashi 
Shumei Okawa
Iwane Matsui

References

 

 Bibliography 
 Saaler, Sven and J. Victor Koschmann, eds., Pan-Asianism in Modern Japanese History: Colonialism, Regionalism and Borders. London and New York: Routledge, 2007. 
 Saaler, Sven and C.W.A. Szpilman, eds., Pan-Asianism: A Documentary History, Rowman & Littlefield, 2011. two volumes (1850–1920, 1920–present). (vol. 1),  (vol. 2)
 

Further reading
 Kamal, Niraj (2002) Arise Asia: Respond to White Peril. New Delhi: Wordsmith .
 Starrs, Roy (2001) Asian Nationalism in an Age of Globalization. London: RoutledgeCurzon .
 Starrs, Roy (2002) Nations under Siege: Globalization and Nationalism in Asia.'' New York: Palgrave Macmillan .
 

 
World War II propaganda
Colonialism
Nationalist movements in Asia
Far-right politics in Asia
Regionalism (international relations)
Political movements in Asia
Political ideologies
Politics and race
Shōwa Statism
Axis powers